Robert Paul Huntsman (born 5 May 1957) is a former English rugby union player. Huntsman played for Headingley as a prop and won two international caps for the England national rugby union team, both during the 1985 England rugby union tour of New Zealand.

References

1957 births
Living people
English rugby union players
England international rugby union players
Rugby union props
Leeds Tykes players
Rugby union players from Beverley